Saint-Elzéar is a municipality in La Nouvelle-Beauce Regional County Municipality in Quebec, Canada. It is part of the Chaudière-Appalaches region and the population was 2,400 as of the Canada 2016 Census. Founded in 1855, it was named in tribute to Elzéar-Henri Juchereau Duchesnay, seigneur of neighbouring Sainte-Marie-de-la-Nouvelle-Beauce.

References

Commission de toponymie du Québec
Ministère des Affaires municipales, des Régions et de l'Occupation du territoire

Designated places in Quebec
Municipalities in Quebec
Incorporated places in Chaudière-Appalaches